Chauru is an ILRC and village in Phagi Tehsil in Jaipur district, Rajasthan.

Chauru has eight patwar circles - Ghatiyali, Chauru North, Chauru South, Dalniya, Nareda, Mandawara, Mandawari and Mendwas.

Based on 2011 census, Chauru has 734 households with total population of 5,078 (52.46% males, 47.54% females). Total area of village is 47.57 km2.  There are 3 primary schools, one commercial bank and one post office in the village.

Villages in Chauru

References

Cities and towns in Jaipur district